{{Infobox character
| name = Kato
| data21 = The Green Hornet
| lbl22 = Abilities
| franchise = Green Hornet
| series = 
| data23 = * Jiujitsu
 Kung-fu
| lbl21 = Partnerships
| data22 = * Master martial artist
 Automotive engineering expert
| lbl23 = Martial arts
| image = Kato (The Green Hornet character).jpg
| nationality =
| gender = Male
| children = Mulan Kato
| portrayer = * Raymond Hayashi (1936)
 Keye Luke (1940, 1941)
 Bruce Lee (1966, 1967)
 Jay Chou (2011)
| creator = Fran Striker
| last = The Green Hornet (2011)
| first = The Green Hornet (1936)
| caption = Art by Aaron Campbell
}}
Kato is a fictional character from The Green Hornet franchise. This character has appeared with the Green Hornet in radio, film, television, book and comic book versions. Kato was the Hornet's assistant and has been played by a number of actors. On radio, Kato was initially played by Raymond Hayashi, then Roland Parker who had the role for most of the run, and in the later years Mickey Tolan and Paul Carnegie. Keye Luke took the role in the movie serials, and in the television series, he was portrayed by Bruce Lee. Jay Chou played Kato in the 2011 Green Hornet film.

Character history
Kato was Britt Reid's valet, who doubled as The Green Hornet's masked driver and partner to help him in his vigilante adventures, disguised as the activities of a racketeer and his chauffeur/bodyguard/enforcer. According to the storyline, years before the events depicted in the series, Britt Reid had saved Kato's life while traveling in the Far East. Depending on the version of the story, this prompted Kato to become Reid's assistant or friend. In the anthology book, The Green Hornet Chronicles from Moonstone Books, author Richard Dean Starr's story "Nothing Gold Can Stay: An Origin Story of Kato" explores the character's background and how he ends up living in America, suggesting that Kato met Britt Reid on a later trip back to his homeland while in search of his mother.

Radio program and nationality
George W. Trendle, the owner of radio station WXYZ in Michigan first created and produced "The Green Hornet" show in 1936, with the scripts being written by Fran Striker. The show became so popular it ran for nearly two decades and spun off at least two films. This was Trendle and Striker's second big radio hit; their first was "The Lone Ranger". 

In the 1936 premiere of the radio program, Kato was presented as being Japanese. By 1939, the invasion of China by the Empire of Japan made this bad for public relations, and from that year until 1945 "Britt Reid's Japanese valet" in the show's opening was then simply identified by the announcer as his "faithful valet".  The first of Universal's two movie serials, produced in 1939 but not released to theaters until early 1940, referred in passing to Kato being "a Korean". By 1941, Kato had begun to be referred to as Filipino.  A long-standing, but false, urban legend maintained that the switch from one to the other occurred immediately after the 1941 bombing of Pearl Harbor. In serials, Kato was played by Chinese-born American actor Keye Luke. In the 2011 film, Kato (played by Jay Chou) tells Britt Reid that he was born in the Chinese city of Shanghai; Reid replies by saying that he "love[s] Japan".

Television series

The televised series of "The Green Hornet" was created and produced by William Dozier, the owner of Greenway Productions, for ABC. It ran from 1966 to 1967 and was then cancelled after that one season. Van Williams played the Green Hornet and Bruce Lee played Kato. Dozier was also the creator of the more popular "Batman" television series. Even though he had the Green Hornet and Kato appear on "Batman" three times, they never acquired a large audience.

It was due in part to Bruce Lee's portrayal of this character, that the Green Hornet became more well-known, and that martial arts became more popular in the United States in the 1960s. Indeed, Lee refused to follow the American director's expectation of fisticuff fights and insisted that he be allowed to use his martial arts skills. They became so popular with the audience that Van Williams, who played the Green Hornet, asked to be taught some moves. In a crossover episode of Batman from the same time and companies, Kato had a battle with Robin that ended in a draw (the same thing happened simultaneously with their senior partners). This was in part because Lee refused to participate in a fight that showed Asian-style martial arts being defeated; the original script had the Green Hornet and Kato being beaten by Batman and Robin. The popular impression Lee made at the time is demonstrated by one of the TV series tie-in coloring books produced by Watkins & Strathmore. It is titled Kato's Revenge Featuring the Green Hornet. The Green Hornet's success in Hong Kong, where it was popularly known as The Kato Show, led to Lee starring in the feature films that would make him a pop culture icon. This show launched Bruce Lee's adult television and film career. 

In the TV series Kato (portrayed by Bruce Lee) is not at all a mechanic but a professional servant, a highly skilled driver, and a master of the art of war. In all other versions of the story, he is also a mechanic, with the creations of both the special automobile, the Black Beauty, and the Hornet's trademark sleeping gas and the gun that delivered it attributed to him. In the television series, he also became an expert in martial arts, which was implied in the first film serial with his use of a tranquilizing "chop" to the back of a thug's neck.

Comic book adaptations
All Green Hornet comic book adaptations have included Kato. These were produced by Helnit (later Holyoke), Harvey, Dell and, tied into the television version, Gold Key. Beginning in 1989 one, published by NOW Comics, established a continuity between the different versions of the story. In this comic, the TV/Bruce Lee version of Kato was the son of the Kato from the radio stories and had the given name Hayashi as an homage to the character's first radio actor.

The comic also established a new Kato, a much younger half-sister of the television-based character, Mishi. This female Kato also insisted on being treated as the Hornet's full partner rather than a sidekick. However, the Green Hornet, Inc., soon withdrew approval and this character was replaced with the 1960s version after Vol. 1, #10. Her removal was explained by having the Kato family company, Nippon Today, needing her automotive designing services at its Zurich, Switzerland facility. Mishi would return in Volume 2, appearing sporadically in the new costumed identity of the Crimson Wasp, on a vendetta against the criminal, Johnny Dollar. She eventually revealed (in The Green Hornet Vol. 2, #s 12 & 13, August & September 1992) that he had been an embezzling executive at the Swiss plant, whose actions she unwittingly began to expose. Consequently, he had murdered her fiancé and his daughter in an attack that also caused the unknowingly pregnant Mishi, the main target, to miscarry.

In #34, July 1994 issue of that run, she appeared in her "Hornet's partner" guise one additional time, as the masked Paul Reid attended a gangland meeting; the rules stated that each "boss" was allowed two "boys". During this period, Hayashi became romantically involved with District Attorney Diana Reid, daughter of the original Hornet, who even thought for a while that she had conceived his child. In the final issue, Diana discussed their wedding plans with Mishi. In the last two issues, yet another Kato, a nephew to both of these named Kono, was brought in to allow the aging Hayashi to retire from crime-fighting, but the publisher's ceasing of operations prevented much of him being seen. The Bruce Lee-based Kato was also featured in two of his own spin-off miniseries, written by Mike Baron. The first had him defending a Chinese temple, where he had studied kung fu, from the Communist government, while in the second he took the job of bodyguarding a heroin-addicted rock star. A third solo adventure, also by Baron, was announced and promoted first as another miniseries, then as a graphic novel (now subtitled "Dragons in Eden"), but was left unpublished when NOW folded. The line featured one other version of the character.

The three-issue mini-series The Green Hornet: Dark Tomorrow (June–August 1993) was set approximately one hundred years in the future, and had an Asian-American Green Hornet, real name Clayton Reid, who had been corrupted by power and truly became the crime boss he was supposed to only pretend to be, fighting a Caucasian Kato. Beyond the reversal of ethnicities, the latter added the claim that he and the future Hornet were cousins, and the art's depiction of this Hornet's unnamed paternal grandparents resembles Paul Reid and Mishi Kato. Although the future Kato is not further identified here, a later "Reid/Kato Family Trees" feature (in The Green Hornet, Vol. 2, #26, October 1993) gave him the first name Luke.

This comic book incarnation gave a degree of official status to a long-standing error about the character, that in his masked identity he is known as Kato. The name was restricted to his private persona in the original radio series, the two movie serials, and most of the television version (there were two slips in this last medium, one on the Batman appearance, the other in the last filmed episode of the Hornet series itself, "Invasion from Outer Space, Part 2"; this story is well out of sync with the rest of the run, and the writer, director, and even the line producer are people with no other credits on the program). But the NOW comic version made a big point of having the masked assistants called Kato, with the woman at one early point telling the equally new Hornet during their first adventure, "While I'm in this funky get-up, call me Kato. It's part of the tradition".

In the Kevin Smith's 2010 revamp of the continuity, Kato is depicted, in modern times, as the elderly but still physically fit valet of the late Britt Reid, killed by a yakuza mobster going by the Black Hornet sobriquet. The elder Kato, in this version a Japanese, forced to act Filipino to avoid the suspicions and the racist charges against his people during WWII, retires his identity along with Britt Reid, and both men decide to devote themselves to their families, respectively raising their offspring Britt Reid Jr. and Mulan Kato.

After Britt Reid's death, Kato returns in America with Mulan, now the second Kato, to act out the Secret Testament of Britt Reid Sr., who wished, in the event of his death, Kato to destroy every Green Hornet paraphernalia still in his possession and whisk Britt Reid Jr. to Japan, for his safety. However both offspring refuse Reid's and Kato's will: Mulan Kato, now clad in a close variation of her father's original outfit, storms off to confront the Yakuza, and Britt Reid Jr. manages to steal one of the Green Hornet costumes to help her, despite having little training on his own.

As the new Kato, Mulan is a strong, physically fit, silent warrior woman, able to perform amazing feats with uncanny strength and precision. Despite having been shown, in her late teens, as a peppy, lively, cheery social butterfly, the adult Mulan Kato is a darker, brooding character who never speaks (despite physically able to do so, Mulan prefers speaking as little as she can to prevent the much talkative Britt Reid Jr., and seemingly everyone else, from talking back) and shows little, if no interest at all, for any form of socialization, a thing that seems to distress the second Green Hornet, every bit the suave socialite his father was.

In addition, the limited series Green Hornet: Parallel Lives by writer Jai Nitz, will serve as a prequel to the 2011 Green Hornet film, exploring the backstory for the film's version of Kato.

In 2013, an eight-issue miniseries called Masks brought together famous heroes from the pulp era. It starred The Shadow, the Green Hornet and Kato, The Spider and Zorro, and was written by Chris Roberson with art by Alex Ross and Dennis Calero.

Films
In 1975, the Taiwanese actor Bruce Li played Kato in Bruce Lee Against Supermen.

A 1994 Hong Kong film, Qing feng xia, starred Kar Lok Chin as a Kato-like masked hero called the Green Hornet (in English subtitles). In one scene, he is reminded of his predecessors, one of whom is represented by a picture of Bruce Lee in his TV Kato costume..

Portrayed in Dragon: The Bruce Lee Story
The 1993 American semi-fictionalized film biography Dragon: The Bruce Lee Story, in which Jason Scott Lee (no relation) portrayed Bruce Lee, featured scenes involving the filming of the TV series The Green Hornet. Van Williams, who starred in that TV series, appeared in the film as the show's director.

 Portrayed in Once Upon a Time in Hollywood 
The 2019 film Once Upon a Time in Hollywood has a flashback scene in which stuntman Cliff Booth (Brad Pitt) has a confrontation with Bruce Lee (played by Mike Moh in full Kato gear) on the set of The Green Hornet. In the scene, an impromptu two-out-of-three martial arts match between Booth and Lee takes place, with both men winning one match, but the fight is broken up before the deciding match can finish.

Feature filmsBlack Mask is a 1996 Hong Kong action film starring Jet Li. The film is an adaptation of the 1992 manhua Black Mask by Li Chi-Tak. In the film, in homage to The Green Hornet, Black Mask wears a domino mask and chauffeur's cap in the same style as Kato from the series. The Black Mask is even compared to Kato in one scene. In 2002, it was followed by a sequel, Black Mask 2: City of Masks starring Andy On.

In the film Legend of the Fist: The Return of Chen Zhen, released late September 2010 in Asia and early 2011 in the United States, there is a large feature of the Green Hornet. The subplot consist of the main character Chen Zhen (played by Donnie Yen) dressing up as a mask vigilante (based on Kato) to stop Japanese assassinations and to protect the people.

The director has mentioned that since Bruce Lee played both Chen Zhen (in the 1972 film Fist of Fury) and Kato (in the 1960s television series The Green Hornet) before, the film was a tribute and dedication to Lee.

Sony Pictures announced plans for a feature film of the superhero in 2008. Released on January 14, 2011, the film starred Seth Rogen, who took on writing duties along with Superbad co-writer Evan Goldberg. Stephen Chow had originally signed to play Kato, but then dropped out. Taiwanese actor Jay Chou replaced Chow as Kato for the film. In this version, Kato is Chinese and grew up as a poor runaway from his orphanage in Shanghai. He was originally employed by Britt Reid's father James as a car mechanic (also making his coffee with a specially-designed machine he had created for the purpose) before joining Britt on the steps that lead to him becoming the Green Hornet as Britt concluded that they had both been wasting their potential. Kato's martial art skills in this version of the series are so exceptional that he claims that time literally slows down for him when he gets an adrenaline rush in a dangerous situation, as well as his traditional role as mechanic and driver. Although he and Britt have a temporary falling-out when they argue over their respective importance to the "Green Hornet" concept - Kato acting as the actual action man of the Hornet while Britt is the public face as Kato is too fast for any cameras to see him - they patch up their differences in time to destroy the gang of crime lord Chudnofsky.

In 2016, Paramount Pictures and Chernin Entertainment acquired the rights to The Green Hornet and started preliminary work on developing a reboot with Gavin O'Connor attached to produce and direct the film and Sean O'Keefe as writer. In 2020, Amasia Entertainment has gained the rights of the Green Hornet and officially teamed with Universal Pictures for the reboot titled Green Hornet and Kato.

 Notes 

References

External links
 Kato of the Green Hornet at the Grand Comics Database
 "Turning Japanese." Snopes''. February 1, 2011.
 William Dozier, the producer and narrator of The Green Hornet TV series, has his papers preserved at the American Heritage Center.

Green Hornet
Comic book sidekicks
Radio characters introduced in 1936
Comics characters introduced in 1940
Fictional Japanese people
Chinese superheroes
Fictional Jeet Kune Do practitioners
Fictional judoka
Fictional bodyguards
Fictional chauffeurs
Fictional software engineers
Fictional hackers
Fictional henchmen
Fictional inventors
Fictional mechanics
Fictional orphans
Fictional scientists
Fictional vigilantes
Fictional valets
Fictional wushu practitioners
Film sidekicks
Martial artist characters in television
Orphan characters in film
Orphan characters in television
Radio sidekicks
Television sidekicks
Dell Comics characters
Dynamite Entertainment characters
Golden Age superheroes
Film serial characters